In psychology, grit is a positive, non-cognitive trait based on an individual's perseverance of effort combined with the passion for a particular long-term goal or end state (a powerful motivation to achieve an objective). This perseverance of effort promotes the overcoming of obstacles or challenges that lie on the path to accomplishment and serves as a driving force in achievement realization. Distinct but commonly associated concepts within the field of psychology include "perseverance", "hardiness", "resilience", "ambition", "need for achievement" and "conscientiousness". These constructs can be conceptualized as individual differences related to the accomplishment of work rather than talent or ability. This distinction was brought into focus in 1907 when William James challenged the field to further investigate how certain individuals are capable of accessing richer trait reservoirs enabling them to accomplish more than the average person, but the construct dates back at least to Francis Galton, and the ideals of persistence and tenacity have been understood as a virtue at least since Aristotle.

Definition
Grit was defined as "perseverance and passion for long-term goals" by psychologist Angela Duckworth and colleagues, who extensively studied grit as a personality trait. They observed that individuals high in grit were able to maintain their determination and motivation over long periods despite experiences with failure and adversity. They concluded that grit is a better predictor of success than intellectual talent (IQ), based on their evaluation of educational attainment by adults, GPA among Ivy League undergraduates, dropout rate of cadets at West Point US Military Academy, and ranking in the National Spelling Bee.

Earlier studies of achievement often emphasized the notion that high-achieving individuals typically possess traits above and beyond that of normal ability. Duckworth et al. emphasized that grit is a better predictor of achievement than intellectual talent (IQ), because grit serves as the overriding factor that provides the stamina required to "stay the course" amid challenges and setbacks.

Marcus Crede and colleagues later observed that the contribution of grit to the prediction of success mostly stems from the perseverance of effort, and they questioned the inclusion of consistency of interest (passion) as one of the aspects of grit, as defined by Duckworth et al.

Positive psychology
Grit ties in with positive psychology and in particular, with perseverance. As mentioned earlier, the ability to stick with and pursue a goal over a long period is an important aspect of grit. This area of positive psychology has been interested in the process of perseverance as a positive indicator of long term success. A 2014 study by Von Culin, Tsukayama and Duckworth found that individual differences in grit and its two component facets—perseverance of effort and consistency of interests over time—may derive in part from differences in what makes people happy.

Intelligence
One of the best predictors of future achievement has been intelligence. This relationship has been found in scholastic achievement as well as in job performance. As such, one might expect that grit would be strongly correlated with intelligence. In fact, this prompted one of the early questions asked in grit research, "Why do some individuals accomplish more than others of equal intelligence?". Somewhat surprisingly, in four separate samples, grit was found to be either orthogonal to or slightly inversely correlated with intelligence. This means that grit, unlike many traditional measures of performance, is not tied to intelligence. The researchers suggested that this helps explain why some very intelligent individuals do not consistently perform well over long periods.

Personality measure
The grit measure has been compared to the Big Five personality traits, which are a group of broad personality dimensions consisting of openness to experience, conscientiousness, extraversion, agreeableness, and neuroticism. In one study by Duckworth and Quinn (2009), the Short Grit Scale (Grit–S) and 12-item self-report measure of grit (Grit–O) measuring grit was strongly correlated with conscientiousness (r = 0.77, p < 0.001 and r = 0.73, p < 0.001). A large study of twins measuring both conscientiousness and grit found that they had a genetic correlation of 0.86. A subsequent meta-analysis found that the grit was functionally a measure of conscientiousness. Despite these high correlations with conscientiousness, it is suggested that grit is more strongly associated with longer term and multi-year goals such as education. Large studies suggest only weak links of grit to these long term goals, much smaller than links to IQ and to conscientiousness. Grit is also similar to need for achievement, but is suggested to relate to extremely long-term goals pursued without positive feedback, while need for achievement is suggested to lack this long-term component.

Related psychological constructs
Traditional constructs in this area include perseverance, hardiness, resilience, ambition, self-control, and need for achievement. Grit has been argued to be distinguishable from each of these in the following ways.

Perseverance is the steadfast pursuit of a task, mission, or journey in spite of obstacles, discouragement, or distraction. In contrast, grit is argued to be a trait of perseverance. Grit enables an individual to persevere in accomplishing a goal despite obstacles over an extended period. When compared with the construct of persistence, grit adds a component of passion for the goal. This goal passion also contributes to the ability of the individual to sustain effort over the long term.

Salvatore Maddi (2006) defined hardiness as a combination of attitudes that provide the courage and motivation to do the hard, strategic work of turning stressful circumstances from potential disasters into growth opportunities. While grit is primarily a measure of an individual's ability to persist in obtaining a specific goal over an extended time period (Duckworth et al., 2007), hardiness refers to an individual's ability to persist through difficult circumstances and does not address the individual's long term persistence toward a specific goal. Maddi (2006) developed a theoretical model of hardiness as a tool for developing resilience.

Resilience is a dynamic process in which an individual overcomes significant adversity, usually in the form of a life changing event or difficult personal circumstances. Resilience can be conceptualized as an adaptive response to a challenging situation. Grit involves maintaining goal focused effort for extended periods of time, often while facing adversity but does not require a critical incident. Importantly, grit is conceptualized as a trait while resilience is a dynamic process. Finally, resilience has been almost exclusively studied in children who are born into "at-risk" situations. Although resilience researchers recognize that adults likely demonstrate resilience in a similar manner to children, the resilience process has not been studied in a mature population.

Ambition is broadly defined as the desire for attainment, power, or superiority. In contrast to ambition, grit is not associated with seeking fame or external recognition for achievements. Ambition is often associated with a desire for fame. Unlike ambitious individuals, gritty individuals do not seek to distinguish themselves from other people, but to obtain personal goals.

Self-control, an aspect of inhibitory control, is the ability to control one's emotions and behavior in the face of temptations and impulses. Duckworth and James Gross (2014) used a hierarchical-goal perspective on self-control and grit to show that while both these constructs entail aligning actions with intentions, they operate in different ways and over different timescales and are distinct psychological mechanisms that are key determinants of success.

David McClelland (1961) described need for achievement as a drive to complete manageable goals that enable the individual to receive immediate feedback. In contrast to need for achievement, gritty individuals consciously set long-term goals that are difficult to attain and do not waver from these difficult goals, regardless of the presence of feedback. Additionally, need for achievement has been studied for almost 50 years and has been found to positively correlate to self-efficacy and learning goal orientation. These links have not yet been tested in the grit literature.

Scientific findings and controversy
The primary scientific findings on grit come from Duckworth and colleagues' 2007 examination of grit as an individual difference trait capable of predicting long-term success. Subsequently, in a 2016 meta-analysis of the structure and correlates of grit, Crede et al. questioned Duckworth's construct of grit (that included both the perseverance of effort facet and the consistency of interest facet), concluding that the primary utility of the grit construct may stem from the perseverance of effort.

Duckworth et al. (2007) initially proposed that individuals who possess a drive to tirelessly work through challenges, failures, and adversity to achieve set goals are uniquely positioned to reach higher achievements than others who lack similar stamina. In a series of six studies Duckworth et al. proposed, developed, and tested a two-factor grit scale with notable results. In addition to validating their grit scale, the authors also found support suggesting that grit provided incremental predictive validity for education and age above and beyond the Big Five personality traits (Study 2); that higher levels of grit were more highly associated with cumulative grade point average (GPA) in an Ivy league sample when compared to those with lower grit levels (r = 0.25, p < 0.01; Study 3); that grit predicted retention after their first summer in two classes of cadets at the United States Military Academy (Study 4); and that participants in a National Spelling Bee with higher grit scores typically work harder and longer than less gritty peers, ultimately resulting in better performance. This series of studies provides empirical evidence that an individual difference conceptualized as grit can account for significant variance in performance across a variety of settings.

Although Duckworth argued that grit predicted academic performance better than the Big Five personality traits, that claim was later called into question by Kaili Rimfeld and colleagues, who argued that Big Five personality factors have equal predictive ability, and by Crede, who concluded that grit is very strongly correlated with conscientiousness, and found that after controlling for conscientiousness, only one component of grit (perseverance of effort) explains variance in academic performance.

Rimfeld et al. in 2016 conducted the largest study of grit in the United Kingdom, that was based on academic achievement of 2,321 twin pairs (U.K.-representative sample and genetically sensitive design), and compared the predictive ability of grit as a trait (measured by the Grit-S) to the predictions based on Big Five personality traits. Rimfeld et al. found that while personality is a significant predictor of academic achievement, grit as a separate construct added little to the prediction of academic achievement derived from Big Five personality factors, such as conscientiousness.

Crede, Tynan, and Harms in 2016 conducted a meta-analytic synthesis of prior empirical research on grit by summarizing data from 88 independent samples and over 66,000 individuals, and found that grit is only moderately correlated with performance, and that only one component of grit that was described by Duckworth et al. in 2007 (perseverance of effort) explains variance in academic performance. The study consequently suggested to separate consistency of interest (passion) from the perseverance (effort), since Crede et al. observed that contribution of grit to the prediction of success mostly stems from the perseverance of effort.

Psychologist K. Anders Ericsson, in his 2016 book Peak: Secrets from the New Science of Expertise, criticized the tendency to credit persistent practice to traits such as grit or willpower; he wrote: "It may seem natural to assume that these people who maintain intense practice schedules for years have some rare gift of willpower or 'grit' or 'stick-to-itiveness' that the rest of us just lack, but that would be a mistake for two very compelling reasons." The first reason is that motivation is a situation-specific attribute: People generally find it easier to practice in some areas than in others. The second reason is that grit and willpower are traits that are assigned to someone after the fact, for example: John practiced persistently for years, so he must have incredible grit. But, Ericsson explained: "This sort of circular thinking—'The fact that I couldn't keep practicing indicates that I don't have enough willpower, which explains why I couldn't keep practicing'—is worse than useless; it is damaging in that it can convince people that they might as well not even try." Instead of attributing success to grit or willpower, Ericsson recommended analyzing the various factors that shape a person's motivation in a given situation.

Since 2014, grit has been the subject of critical commentary and debate in Education Week, with contributors discussing the strengths and weaknesses of how the idea of grit has been used by educators. Some contributors called "the grit narrative" a kind of victim blaming when educators who emphasize grit downplay the obstacles that some students face such as conditions of poverty, racism, and ineffective teaching.

The idea that grit can be enhanced was also criticized in a 2019 paper by Moreau and colleagues.

In a meta-analysis performed by Lam and Zhou (2022), it was found that overall grit/2 facets is cross-culturally related to academic achievement.  However, the level of persistency and grit may vary among people of different cultures.

See also

 Delayed gratification
 Patience
 Prudence
 Self-control
 Sisu
 Temperance (virtue)
 What does not kill me makes me stronger

References

Further reading

External links
 

Personality traits
Courage